Eucalyptus lateritica, commonly known as laterite mallee, is a species of mallee that is endemic to a small area in the south-west of Western Australia. It has rough bark on the lower half of the trunk, smooth grey bark above, lance-shaped adult leaves, flower buds in groups of nine or eleven, white flowers and shortened spherical fruit.

Description
It has smooth greyish brown bark, usually with rough, corky bark on the lower half of the trunk. Flowering occurs between August and October and the flowers are white.

Taxonomy and naming
Eucalyptus lateritica was first formally described in 1986 by the botanists Ian Brooker and Stephen Hopper from a specimen collected by Hopper near Mount Lesueur and the description was published in the journal Nuytsia. The specific epithet (lateritica) is derived from the Latin word lateritius meaning "brick-red", referring to the lateritic gravel which dominated the area where this species grows.

The species is part of the subgenus Eucalyptus series Diversiformae, a group of mallee species that all have adult leaves held erect, buds with a single unscarred operculum and pyramidal seeds. The other species in this series include E. erectifolia, E. platydisca, E. diversifolia, E. todtiana, E. pachyloma, E. dolorosa and E. buprestium.

Distribution and habitat
Laterite mallee is found on breakaways and mesas in the Badgingarra - Mount Lesueur area where it grows in sandy-gravelly lateritic soils.

Conservation status
This mallee is listed as "vulnerable" under the Australian Government Environment Protection and Biodiversity Conservation Act 1999 and as "Threatened Flora (Declared Rare Flora — Extant)" by the Department of Environment and Conservation (Western Australia). The main potential threats to the species include susceptibility to disease caused by Phytophthora cinnamomi, fire, insect damage, grazing, weeds and mining activities.

See also

List of Eucalyptus species

References

Eucalypts of Western Australia
lateritica
Myrtales of Australia
Plants described in 1986
Taxa named by Ian Brooker
Taxa named by Stephen Hopper